Francis Chesley is a former linebacker in the National Football League.

Biography
Chesley was born Francis Michael Chesley on July 14, 1955 in Washington, D.C.. He is a graduate of Eastern High School.

Career
Chesley was drafted in the sixth round of the 1978 NFL Draft and was a member of the Green Bay Packers that season. He played at the collegiate level at the University of Wyoming.

See also
List of Green Bay Packers players

References

1955 births
Living people
Players of American football from Washington, D.C.
 Eastern High School (Washington, D.C.) alumni
Green Bay Packers players
American football linebackers
University of Wyoming alumni
Wyoming Cowboys football players